Johan Richter may refer to:

 Johan Richter (architect) (1925-1998), Danish architect
 Johan Richter (inventor) (1901–1997), Norwegian-Swedish inventor
 Johan Richter (painter) (1665–1745), Swedish painter active in Italy